There were many events that led to the financial crisis of the late 2000s, and many differing views on which parties were primarily responsible. The main groups that have been identified for playing a major role in the crisis include: investment bankers, credit rating agencies, financial statement preparers, the Federal Reserve, investors, loan originators, auditors, and borrowers among others. For a detailed background on the causes of the crisis and the parties that contributed please reference:Causes of the 2007-2012 global financial crisis and “History of Fair Value Issues” The purpose of this article is to expand on the role that accountants specifically played within the late 2000s financial crisis.

Fair Value Accounting and its Role in the Financial Crisis

Financial Accounting Standard 157
In 2006 the Financial Accounting Standards (FASB) implemented FAS 157 in order to establish a generally accepted accounting definition of fair value, methods for measuring fair value, and to expand disclosures about fair value measurements in financial statements. The  statement aimed to increase consistency, comparability and transparency among statements that incorporated fair-value measurements. FAS 157 defines a hierarchy of three levels of inputs to obtain the fair value of an asset or liability.

These levels are classified as Level 1, Level 2 or Level 3. These levels differ in that Level 1 inputs have active markets, Level 2 inputs use models for similar assets, and Level 3 inputs are unobservable, relying on model assumptions. Since Level 2 and Level 3 inputs do not have active markets with identical assets, the discretion of management is required when determining the fair value of these assets. This provides room for managerial manipulation.

The Link between Fair Value and Crises

As mentioned in the article written by Laux and Leuz, linking banking capital regulation and fair value accounting is the most plausible way fair value accounting could have contributed to the crisis. The explanation that links the two subjects is that asset values deviate from their fundamental market prices, which causes a bank to write down its assets and, in turn, deplete its capital. Consequently, the asset write-downs may force the bank to sell such assets at fire sale prices and start a downward spiral. This causes a contagion problem and forces other banks to take similar write-downs. However, according to Laux and Leuz, this is not what typically happens in banks’ practices.

Fair Value Accounting in Practice

In practice, Banks’ asset categories include loans and leases, available-for-sale and held-to-maturity securities, and trading assets. Loans and leases, however, comprise the biggest and most important category for banks. These assets are classified as either “held-for-investment,” which is typically a small percent of the loans, or “held-for-sale”, accounted for at the lower of historical cost or fair value. The loans and leases in the held-for-sale classification are tested for impairment and, if impaired, written down to the present value of future cash flows. Loans are usually impaired because creditors will be unable to collect all amounts due.

This was a reoccurring problem in the current financial crisis. Since the crisis unfolded, fair value assets held by banks increasingly became Level 3 inputs (unobservable). Ultimately, most of the assets held by financial institutions were either not subject to fair value, or did not impact the income statement or balance sheet accounts.

Fair value as a Contributor

There has been debate on whether fair value accounting contributed to the crisis or simply was the messenger of the crisis. The opponents of fair value believe it is the contributor to the crisis. Opponents, such as FDIC chairman William Isaac and House Speaker Newt Gingrich, lobbied and urged for the suspension of mark-to-market accounting. Clearly, the lobbying has been an issue of debate as well – one that proponents are not pleased with, as lobbying the FASB presents an issue of its independence. These people believe fair value accounting is not the most relevant method of measuring financial instruments.

Steve Forbes is another opponent who believes fair value accounting was the “principal reason” for the crisis in 2008.  One argument is that a majority of structured debt, corporate bonds and mortgages were still performing, but their prices had fallen below their true value due to frozen markets (contagion explained above). Opponents also state that fair value accounting undermines critical foundations of financial reporting, including verifiability, reliability and conservatism. It is argued that fair value accounting lacks all three attributes. Some opponents may even suggest that historical cost accounting is more accurate by arguing that financial institutions are forced to record any permanent impairment in the market value of their assets.

Fair Value as a Messenger

On the other hand, proponents for fair value accounting believe that fair value was not the cause of the crisis. Instead, they suggest fair value only communicated the effects of poor decisions, such as subprime loans. Proponents also believe that fair value accounting provides investors with critical transparency of companies. There are empirical foundations that prove fair value accounting to be the better indicator of value when compared to historical cost. The lack of transparency by using historical cost accounting may make matter worse. It is possible the market reacts more extremely if the fair-value or current market prices are not disclosed. There is no empirical evidence that using historical cost accounting will calm the investors.

As with any standard setting body, the FASB was faced with tradeoffs when it made the decision to implement this new standard. Since this is an imperfect world with information problems, it is difficult to know what the absolute best option is. This is why it is important that the FASB, along with all other participants in the financial environment, become knowledgeable in their fields, and assess how their decisions and performance may affect others. This stands true for auditors and their role in the financial markets and crisis.

Auditors’ Role in the Financial Crisis

Demand for Audits

The primary driver of audit demand is the desire to enhance credibility of the information that companies make available to their potential investors. Without an independent party verifying and providing an opinion on a company's financial statements, it is significantly more difficult for firms to attract the investment of the uninformed public. It is, therefore, in a company's best interest to have an individual outside of the firm perform an audit in order to provide assurance on the reliability of the information made available to the public. This principle of value derived from an audit is evidenced by the fact that 82 percent of companies listed on the New York Stock Exchange were being audited by CPA's even before it became mandatory with the Securities Exchange Acts of 1933 and 1934.

Information Asymmetry

The concept of information asymmetry demonstrates the need for auditors as it shows how the gap in information can cause market inefficiencies. Information asymmetry occurs when one party in a transaction has either more or superior information than the other party involved has. This becomes a problem because it doesn't allow for the uninformed party to make sound decisions. The result often leaves the party without the information ending up on the loser's side of the deal.

When information asymmetry is pertinent, a situation known as a “Market for Lemons” may occur.  This theory states that when a seller is more informed than a buyer, the buyer should assume that the quality of the product is average at best due to the lack of information. Therefore, sellers of high quality products will not be able to get the value that they want from buyers and have no choice but to withdraw from the market unless they are willing to receive an unfair price. This leaves only lower quality items left for sale. The result is that trading occurs only at low levels of quality, leaving out both those who want to buy and sell high quality products.

Information Gap during the Financial Crisis

The financial crisis showed evidence of this theory as investors couldn't decipher between securities that were backed by high quality or sub-prime home loans. It is likely that had better information been made available to investors, they would have stayed away from the investments backed by these bad mortgages, or at minimum would have demanded higher yield rates. Information asymmetry can lead to extremely inefficient markets, and the need for credible information brings rise to someone who can help bridge the gap between buyers and sellers.

Effect of Audit Quality on Information

	Factors such as independence, expertise, and extent of testing, among others, influence the quality of an audit. A high-quality audit is more desirable than a low-quality audit because it provides more assurance of detecting material misstatements that could mislead investors. Studies show that audits that are high in quality also lead to higher quality information in the capital markets and less information asymmetry between traders. Experienced audit staff and the use of industry specialists are listed as contributors of audit quality, which results in an increased quality in the transfer of information.

Conversely, as audit quality begins to decrease it is more likely that material information that should be disclosed will be excluded because it was not detected. A common catalyst of audit quality suffering is when firms focus on checking off the procedures performed during an audit without giving adequate attention to the underlying forces driving the figures. In an effort to increase audit efficiency auditors may be tempted to perform the minimum amount of work necessary to follow the legal or firm-wide requirements of an audit.

Even if an audit is performed in accordance with Generally Accepted Auditing Standards, it is possible that an audit will fail to discover potentially misleading information. For this reason, it is crucial for auditors to plan the audit engagement in such a way that they can obtain a great understanding of the client's business, and in particular, areas that are susceptible to high levels of risk.

Auditor Shortcomings in the Crisis

In light of the information available, it is clear that several different groups played a major role in either causing or exacerbating the crisis. Although auditors may not have been a primary culprit in causing the crisis, it seems that more could have been done to prevent these events from occurring. Before assigning any blame to auditors, it is important to remember the role they play in the financial markets.

Auditors provide assurance on whether the information included in a company's financial statements is free of material misstatement, disclosed properly, and is in conformance with Generally Accepted Accounting Principles. It is not an auditor's duty to stop companies from making unwise business decisions that put their stakeholders at risk. However, auditors have drawn criticism for overlooking whether the information disclosed was adequate in accurately reflecting company strength.

One area that auditors may have failed to perform their duty during the crisis was in understanding how management was valuing their assets. It is an auditor's responsibility to assess these valuations, and had auditors fulfilled this duty to an adequate level it seems extremely likely that the shaky foundation of the mortgage-backed securities would have been uncovered.

Auditors clearly serve a very important role in maintaining the proper functioning of the market. Because of their high levels of skill and expertise, an auditor's opinion carries significant weight in helping mitigate the risk of information gaps in the market. For this reason, the public has every right to believe that an unqualified opinion from an auditor really does stand for something. In the case of the recent financial crisis, one can argue that this broader purpose of the audit took a back seat to satisfying the legal requirements of an audit as efficiently as possible.

Moving Forward

As auditors move towards continual improvement in audit quality, the chance of audit failure significantly decreases. The ability to learn from mistakes made during the financial crisis could help auditors plan future engagements in a way that minimizes the likelihood of overlooking key factors in the audit. This could result in a significant reduction of problems at the magnitude we observed over the last few years in the crisis. In order to accomplish this goal, auditors should go further than simply adhering to auditing standards. This may be achieved by implementing practices that attempt to satisfy the full intent of the standards in place. Although it is unlikely that audit failures will ever be eliminated, if firms adopt this type of approach it is realistic to think that crises in the future will not leave such drastic results.

References

Great Recession